Heidecke Lake State Fish and Wildlife Area is an Illinois state park on  in Grundy County, Illinois, United States. It is an artificial cooling pond originally excavated to enable the operation of the now defunct Collins Generating Station.

Notes

References

External links
 

State parks of Illinois
Protected areas of Grundy County, Illinois
Cooling ponds